California's 77th State Assembly district is one of 80 California State Assembly districts. It is currently represented by Democrat Brian Maienschein of San Diego.  Elected to the Assembly four times as a Republican, Maienschein became a Democrat on January 24, 2019.

District profile 
The district encompasses much of northern San Diego east of Interstate 5, centered on Marine Corps Air Station Miramar. It also extends into the North County region, including the city of Poway.

San Diego County – 15.0%
 Fairbanks Ranch
 Poway
 Rancho Santa Fe
 San Diego – 29.7%

Election results from statewide races

List of Assembly Members 
Due to redistricting, the 77th district has been moved around different parts of the state. The current iteration resulted from the 2011 redistricting by the California Citizens Redistricting Commission.

Election results 1992 - present

2020

2018

2016

2014

2012

2010

2008

2006

2004

2002

2000

1998

1996

1994

1992

See also 
 California State Assembly
 California State Assembly districts
 Districts in California

References

External links 
 District map from the California Citizens Redistricting Commission

77
Government of San Diego County, California
Government of San Diego
Poway, California
Rancho Santa Fe, California